The Campylobacterales are an order of Campylobacterota which make up the epsilon subdivision, together with the small family Nautiliaceae. They are Gram-negative. Most of the species are microaerophilic.

Molecular signatures
Comparative genomic analysis has led to the identification of 49 proteins which are uniquely found in virtually all species of the order Campylobacterales. Additionally, two conserved signature indels have been identified which, along with the proteins, serve as molecular markers for the order. The indels are a three-amino-acid insertion in the B protein of the Uvr ABC system, and a two-amino-acid deletion in phenylalanyl-tRNA synthetase.

References

Campylobacterota